The James River Plantations – Charles City County, Virginia is a local tourism association organized in 1993 by nine historic landmark plantations and two fine dining establishments, as the first tourism organization in Charles City County, Virginia.  The original membership included Belle Air Plantation, Berkeley Plantation, Coach House Tavern, Edgewood Plantation, Evelynton Plantation, Indian Fields Tavern, North Bend Plantation, Piney Grove at Southall's Plantation, Sherwood Forest Plantation, Shirley Plantation and Westover Plantation.  The association operates under bylaws and the current members of the association, as of 2006, include Belle Air Plantation, Edgewood Plantation, North Bend Plantation, Piney Grove at Southall's Plantation and Westover Plantation.

The initial project of association was the "James River Plantation" brochure, designed in 1993, first printed in 1994, and printed seven times subsequently.  In 1995 plantation association offered a cooperative calendar of holiday events first known as "Christmas in the Country," and later referred to as "Christmas in Plantation Country".  In 1996 members of the association also joined to offer progressive Halloween tours and special Garden Week tours.  Also in 1996, the association printed the "Four Centuries of Black History in Charles City County" brochure.

"Virginia's James River Plantations" was a cooperative project conceived of in 2000 by the plantation association.  The participants included plantation sites listed on the National Register of Historic Places along the James River and its tributaries between Richmond and Hampton Roads, as well as regional fine dining establishments.  This regional cooperative project was the recipient of matching-grant funds from the Virginia Tourism Corporation for two years and was also the basis for the fortieth National Register of Historic Places Travel itinerary presented by the National Park Service.

In 2000 The James River Plantations also created the "Jamestown Discovery Trail" as a heritage trail to provide visitors with a meaningful route forward in direction, but back in time, to Jamestown during the 2007 commemoration of America's four-hundredth anniversary. The "Jamestown Discovery Trail" includes official sites, as well as state and local historic markers along the trail.

External links 
The James River Plantations - Charles City County, Virginia
Four Centuries of Black History in Charles City County, Virginia
James River Plantations - National Register of Historic Places Travel Itinerary

Charles City County, Virginia
James River plantations
Organizations established in 1993
1993 establishments in Virginia
Tourism in Virginia